Iñigo Martínez Berridi (born 17 May 1991) is a Spanish professional footballer who plays for Athletic Bilbao and the Spain national team mainly as a centre-back.

He spent most of his professional career with Real Sociedad, playing 238 matches (17 goals scored) in all competitions after making his debut at the age of 20. In January 2018, he signed with Athletic Bilbao.

Martínez won his first cap for Spain in 2013.

Club career

Real Sociedad
Born in Ondarroa, Biscay, Martínez joined Real Sociedad's youth ranks from local CD Aurrerá Ondarroa. He made his senior debut in the 2009–10 season, helping the reserves promote from the fourth division after one year out by contributing 23 games and one goal.

On 27 August 2011, Martínez made his first-team – and La Liga – debut with the Basques, playing the full 90 minutes in a 2–1 away win against Sporting de Gijón. On 2 October he scored his first league goal, from inside his own half in an eventual 2–1 home loss to Athletic Bilbao in a derby.

Martínez scored his third league goal in the same fashion, in a 3–2 away victory over Real Betis on 27 November 2011 (in the 90th minute). He continued to be first choice in the following top-flight campaigns, notably helping the club return to the UEFA Champions League after ten years in 2012–13 by netting four times in 34 matches.

On 26 April 2016, Martínez signed a new five-year deal.

Athletic Bilbao
On 30 January 2018, Martínez signed with Athletic Bilbao for €32 million (his contractual buyout clause amount and a record outlay for the buying club) on a deal until 2023; the fee was around half of the figure received the same day for the player he replaced in the Athletic squad, Aymeric Laporte, who had moved to Manchester City. He made his debut on 4 February, playing the entirety of a 2–0 domestic league defeat away to Girona FC.

During October 2018, Martínez conceded two penalties for foul challenges in two local derby matches in the domestic league, both of which led to the opening goal and were awarded after Video Assistant Referee reviews – the first in a 3–1 home defeat to his old club Real Sociedad and the second in a 1–1 away draw against SD Eibar.

Martínez scored his first goal for Athletic (in his 85th competitive appearance) with a backheel flick in a home league fixture against Betis on 20 June 2020. He later also gave away a penalty, but the kick was missed and his proved to be the only goal of the match.

Under the spotlight playing against his former club Real Sociedad in the delayed 2020 Copa del Rey Final, Martínez had a major role in proceedings: he came close to scoring with a long-range shot in the first half, appeared to have conceded a penalty for handball on the edge of the penalty area at the start of the second half – a VAR review ruled this to have been outside the box –  then did concede a penalty for a foul on Portu ten minutes later. He was sent off by the referee, but another VAR check decided that he had not denied a goalscoring opportunity deliberately and the red card was downgraded to yellow. The penalty was scored, and Real took the trophy with a 1–0 scoreline. In the aftermath, he was seen taking time to offer congratulations to his many old teammates and was praised in the media for his sportsmanship.

International career
Martínez made his debut for the Spain under-21 team in 2011. In the following year, he was picked by manager Luis Milla for his squad that appeared in the 2012 Summer Olympics in London. In the first game against Japan he was sent off late into the first half for bringing down Kensuke Nagai, thus denying a clear goalscoring opportunity, in an eventual 1–0 loss.

Martínez made his first appearance with the full side on 14 August 2013, coming on as a second-half substitute for Sergio Ramos in a 2–0 friendly win over Ecuador. Between September 2018 and March 2021 he received eleven caps, including seven starting appearances; however, he was not included in Luis Enrique's 24-man squad for the UEFA Euro 2020 tournament (delayed for a year by the COVID-19 pandemic in Europe) when it was announced on 24 May, with the player stating that he was not totally happy with his physical situation having missed a number of club matches during the season and an agreement had been made between him, the national body and Athletic that he would not take part.

On 5 June 2022, Martínez scored his first goal, a last-minute header in the 2–2 away draw with the Czech Republic in the UEFA Nations League.

Style of play
He is also known for his tackling, leadership qualities and ability to read the game, as well as competence with the ball at his feet.

Career statistics

Club

International

Spain score listed first, score column indicates score after each Martínez goal.

Honours
Athletic Bilbao
Supercopa de España: 2020–21
Copa del Rey runner-up: 2019–20, 2020–21

Spain U21
UEFA European Under-21 Championship: 2013

Spain
UEFA Nations League runner up: 2020–21

Individual
UEFA U-21 Championship Team of the Tournament: 2013

References

External links

1991 births
Living people
People from Ondarroa
Sportspeople from Biscay
Spanish footballers
Footballers from the Basque Country (autonomous community)
Association football defenders
La Liga players
Segunda División B players
Tercera División players
Real Sociedad B footballers
Real Sociedad footballers
Athletic Bilbao footballers
Spain youth international footballers
Spain under-21 international footballers
Spain under-23 international footballers
Spain international footballers
Olympic footballers of Spain
Footballers at the 2012 Summer Olympics
Basque Country international footballers